Giovan Battista Curiale or Giovan Battista Correale (died 1634) was a Roman Catholic prelate who served as Bishop of Nicastro (1632–1634).

Biography
On 5 July 1632, Giovan Battista Curiale was appointed during the papacy of Pope Urban VIII as Bishop of Nicastro. On 18 July 1632, he was consecrated bishop by Pietro Francesco Montorio, Bishop Emeritus of Nicastro, with Luca Cellesi, Bishop of Martirano, and Francesco Maria Brancaccio, Bishop of Capaccio, with serving as co-consecrators. He served as Bishop of Nicastro until his death in 1634.

References

External links and additional sources
 (for Chronology of Bishops) 
 (for Chronology of Bishops)  

17th-century Italian Roman Catholic bishops
Bishops appointed by Pope Urban VIII
1634 deaths